Hilbram Dunar (born 30 October 1975) is television presenter, radio broadcaster, Book Author, Public Speaking Trainer and Motivation Speaker  master of ceremonies, and entertainer from Indonesia. He is known as the presenter for Formula One racing in RCTI, MNCTV, and now on GTV. Mario Teguh Golden Ways Metro TV, Coffee Break TV One and many more.

Profile

Radio
Born in Banda Aceh, Hilbram has graduated from Trisakti University in Jakarta, at faculty of technic, majoring in Mechanical engineering. He began his career in 1996, when he becomes as radio reporter and broadcaster in MS Tri FM Jakarta. He stays in this radio until 1998. In 1999 he moved to Hard Rock FM Jakarta as the project crew for quiz program, and in 2000 he promoted as advertising & promotion executive in the same place, and since September 2002 he became broadcaster for prime time Radio show called "Drive N Jive" (Amanah Wali 4) and Good Morning HardRockers Show (Putri Untuk Pangeran), Monday - Friday 6-10 am in 87.6 Hardrock FM JAKARTA

Television
After successfully in radio, Hilbram went to try new challenge in television. In 2000 he started his debut in TV as the quiz presenter in Formula 1 live on RCTI (now on Global TV) with Feni Rose, Venita Daben, and Yane Ardian. Another TV show alongside F1 is quiz program Cepat, Tepat, Dapat in SCTV.

In 2001, after the launch of TransTV, he and Venita Daben becomes a presenter in Trans Tune In, Kisi-kisi, and Santapan Pagi. Later in 2002 he is back as presenter of F1 quiz in TPI. Beside F1, he also becomes a presenter of many sports program in TPI. In fact, he tries to acting in soap opera called Kualat on Lativi for one episode. And since 2004 until now, Hilbram exist as presenter of F1 live in GlobalTV. He also becomes presenter at many TV station, such as RCTI and now he well known as the sinetron of Putri Untuk Pangeran on RCTI

Other works
Hilbram is an author. His newest book "My Public Speaking". "Main Hati - Karena Cinta Tidak Bisa Mati Tapi Bisa Pergi kalau Tidak Dijaga Sepenuh hati". His first book published in 2004. The  book titled is "Plastic Heaven - Bukan Cinta Jika Tak Meneteskan Air Mata". It's a book of short stories about Love and life. Now he has his own column "Ask Expert about Love at http://id.she.yahoo.com/tanyaahli/cinta/. He's now known as the ambassador and starring Bodrex commercial. 
Hilbram also try another works. He is one of the best MC in Indonesia. He has teaching public speaking course in Talk Inc and module creator for Public Speaking in Helmy yahya Broadcasting Academy (Jakarta, Bandung, Surabaya), and become as creative director for many TV programs such as "Putri Untuk Pangeran" (RCTI). Until now, Hilbram Dunar is the one form many presenters who successfully become racing presenter and soccer presenter.

Hibram latest book is "My Public Speaking" - the right way to speak in public. Based on his 8 years experience as a Public Speaking consultant

Career highlights

Radio
 2002–Present: Hard Rock FM, Jakarta (Announcer for 87,6 Hard Rock FM - Prime Time Program "Drive n' Jive Amanah Wali 4 & Good Morning HardRockers Show Putri Untuk Pangeran)
 2000-2002: Hard Rock FM, Jakarta (Advertising & Promotion Executive)
 1999: Hard Rock FM, Jakarta (Project Officer for many projects & quiz)
 1996-1998: 104,4 MS TRI FM, Jakarta (Reporter and announcer)

Television
16 June 2003-Present: Sinetron "Putri Untuk Pangeran" (RCTI)
2003–Present: Presenter "Primera Espana La Liga" (RCTI/TPI)
2003: Presenter "F1 Live" (TPI)
2003: Presenter "TIFOSI" (TPI)
2002-2003: Presenter "Italian Seri A League" (TPI)
2000-2002: Host of "Watch Formula 1 Race" Live (RCTI/TPI)
2002: Presenter "Santapan Pagi" live (Trans TV)
2001: Presenter "Kisi-kisi" live (Trans TV)
2001: Presenter "Trans Tune In" live (Trans TV)
2000-2001: Presenter Quiz "Cepat, Tepat, Dapat" (SCTV)

References

1975 births
Living people
People from Banda Aceh
Indonesian sports announcers
Indonesian television presenters